Tholego Keitshekile (born 13 October 1993) is a long-distance runner from Botswana.

In 2019, he competed in the senior men's race at the 2019 IAAF World Cross Country Championships held in Aarhus, Denmark. He finished in 140th place.

References

External links 
 

Living people
1993 births
Place of birth missing (living people)
Botswana male long-distance runners
Botswana male cross country runners